"The Hot Tub" is the 115th episode of NBC sitcom Seinfeld. This was the fifth episode for the seventh season. It aired on October 19, 1995. The episode deals with runner Jean-Paul and Jerry and Elaine's struggles to ensure he wakes up for the New York City Marathon. Meanwhile, a mishap with Kramer's new hot tub causes him to feel constantly cold.

Plot
Elaine has a Trinidadian and Tobagonian runner named Jean-Paul as her house guest. He is in town for the New York City Marathon. Jean-Paul overslept and missed the marathon at the last Olympic Games, and Jerry obsesses with ensuring it does not happen again. Jerry loses faith in Elaine's ability to get Jean-Paul to the race in time after learning she is using a faulty alarm clock that caused Jerry to miss a flight and burns a muffin by setting the microwave to two minutes rather than twenty seconds. Elaine is writing a story for new Himalayan walking shoes in the Peterman catalog, but suffers from writer's block.

With little to do at work, George pretends to be busy by looking frustrated constantly, causing his supervisor Mr. Wilhelm to fear he is stressed out from his work. He sends George to meet with some visiting Houston Astros representatives and "show them a good time." While drinking with the Texans George picks up their habit of amiable swearing, specifically "bastard" and "son of a bitch."

Kramer falls asleep in his new hot tub and the heat pump breaks, leaving him to spend the night in freezing cold water. As a result, his core temperature drops and he is constantly cold. While eating with Jerry, George and Kramer in the coffee shop, Jean-Paul hears George's rampant swearing and believes all Americans speak this way. Later, in Elaine's apartment, he calls her neighbor's baby a "bastard". He gets caught by the landlord, calls him a "son of a bitch" and gets thrown out, forcing him to spend the night with Jerry. Jerry takes him to a hotel but gets into an argument with the desk attendant while attempting to place a wake-up call. Paranoid, Jerry insists they leave and brings Jean-Paul to his own apartment to sleep. Kramer buys a powerful heat pump to work his hot tub and raise his core temperature. Overnight the heat pump causes a power outage in Jerry's building and his alarm clocks fail to go off. Elaine spends the night looking for Jean-Paul, unaware he was thrown out. Her search for him in a dark, desolate neighborhood inspires her story for the Himalayan walking shoes.

Jerry and Jean-Paul oversleep but Jerry gets him to the race in time. Jean-Paul is in first place as he nears the finish line. As he runs past Jerry, Kramer and Elaine he grabs a cup of hot tea from Kramer (who is still attempting to raise his core temperature), mistaking it for water, and scalds himself.

Mr. Wilhelm overhears George on the phone with his Texan buddies, calling them "sons of bitches" and "bastards", unaware they are being friendly. Afraid George has cracked under the pressure, Wilhelm sends George to Mr. Steinbrenner, who says to relax George must use a hot tub. George is forced to sit in a hot tub with Steinbrenner as he rambles on.

References

External links

Seinfeld (season 7) episodes
1995 American television episodes